Everything About Her is a 2016 Filipino comedy-drama film directed by Joyce E. Bernal, starring Vilma Santos, Xian Lim and Ms. Angel Locsin. It was released on January 27, 2016, under Star Cinema. The film earned  on its first day of release.

As of February 20, 2016, the film has earned  The film received generally positive reviews from film critics.

Plot
Successful businesswoman Vivian learns that she is suffering from stage 3 cancer. She hires a private nurse, Jaica, to take care of her. Despite her patient's grumpiness, Jaica begins to play a bigger role in Vivian's life as she becomes the bridge between Vivian and her estranged son Albert, who resents his mother for neglecting her and develops feelings for Jaica. Vivian orders Jaica not to reveal her condition on pain of dismissal, but after a severe medical emergency tells Jaica tells Albert the truth. Initially angry for her betrayal, Vivian forgives Jaica and bonds with her and her family, whom she helps. She eventually reconciles with Albert and after being completely cured, gives her blessing to their relationship

Cast
Vilma Santos as Vivian Rabaya
Angel Locsin as Jaica Domingo
Xian Lim as Albert Mitra
Michael De Mesa as Leo
Nonie Buencamino as JJ 
Khalil Ramos as Jared
Devon Seron as Jenny
Alexa Ilacad as Jewel 
Nor Domingo as Paul
Maria Lopez as Maria
Marielle Sorino as Marielle
Dan Samson as Dan
Vangie Labalan as Ellen
Buboy Villar as Boy
Niña Dolino as Arlene 
Dante Ponce as Mike
Bart Guingona as Dr. Raymond

Release
Everything About Her opened in the Philippines on January 27, 2016, under Star Cinema. The film open in the United States on January 29 and the United Kingdom on February 6.

Rating
The film is graded A by the Cinema Evaluation Board (CEB) and is rated PG (Parental Guidance) by the Movie and Television Review and Classification Board (MTRCB).

Reception

Critical reception
Everything About Her received generally positive reviews from film critics, praising the three main actors' performances.

Oggs Cruz from Rappler gave a positive review saying "Everything About Her is predictable, which isn't necessary a problem. There is also something inherently wrong about the message of women being forced to choose between motherhood and their careers, but that message is but part and parcel of the studio's family-friendly and escapist agendas."

Rod Magaru Show, a blogger gave a rating of 9/10 saying that "The film's attempt to bring out the tears in audience eyes succeeded in multiple scenes. If you have to ask me, I will never ever let my mom feel like I am near yet so far. But of course we live in different background. From professional writers' perspective, there's a story behind everything. How a picture got on a wall. How a scar got on your face."

Accolades

International

Local

References

External links

2016 films
2016 comedy-drama films
Filipino-language films
Films directed by Joyce Bernal
Philippine comedy-drama films
Star Cinema films
2010s Tagalog-language films